Upendra is a 1999 Indian Kannada-language psychological thriller film written and directed by Upendra. It starred Upendra, Raveena Tandon, Prema and Damini. The film explores three human emotions through the relationship between the main character and the three heroines. The songs of the film were written by Upendra and music was composed by Gurukiran. The movie has a cult fanbase. It is said that the director named it as Upendra with the thought that the name includes the names of the main characters of the film (U-Upendra, P-Prema, D-Damini & Ra-Raveena).

The film won Filmfare Award for Best Film (Kannada) and Filmfare Award for Best Director (Kannada). A Japanese who saw the film in Bangalore was impressed by it as he found it similar to the story of Buddha and the concept of Maslow's hierarchy of needs and hence got it released in Japan. It was screened at the Yubari International Fantastic Film Festival in Japan in 2001. A sequel tilted Uppi 2 was released in 2015.

Plot
Betala begins to narrate one of his puzzling tales to Vikramāditya which is the story of Naanu (translates to I/Me/Myself), an ego-driven selfish rogue and the three women in his life. Naanu since childhood hates hypocrisy and always speaks the truth. In the process, he exposes the truth behind everything. A young woman Rathi learns of her father's hatred towards her in this process and falls in love with Naanu. However she finds out that Naanu wants to marry a billionaire Keerthi whose deceased father decides that her husband would inherit her entire wealth. He prints wedding cards and distributes it to all, including the employees working in Keerthi's establishments. This angers Keerthi who orders her guardian's son (who wants to marry her for the same reason) to attack Naanu. They bring a woman Swathi, who lives in his house and torture her. Naanu comes to her rescue and it is revealed that Swathi is Naanu's wife.

Rathi meets him in person and confirms the facts. She threatens to kill both the women and to kill herself if Naanu leaves her for either of those two women. He agrees, and Swathi leaves. She rescues the duo from Keerthi's henchmen and in turn, Naanu persuades her to return. She too threatens to kill both the women if Naanu leaves her for anyone of those two, to which Naanu agrees. He continues to be in a relationship with Rathi and hides it from Swathi and vice versa. However, his obsession for Keerthi never dies. He traps her guardian and after a turn of events, Keerthi agrees to marry him. While they both are in a jubilant mood, Rathi and Swathi learns of this and reach the harbour where the duo is currently hiding in from the henchmen of Keerthi's guardian. When they reach the harbour, Keerthi is informed about Naanu's plans and she drops her marriage plans with him. He kidnaps all the three women and kills Keerthi's guardian and her son.

Naanu and the three women reach an old building where an injured Naanu threatens to kill all of them and forces all to be his life partners to which they do not agree. Meanwhile, a rich person meets Naanu there who happens to be a poor man in the past. Naanu in the past advised him not to follow behind women and instead focus on earning money, adding that women will run for you if you are a wealthy man. At the same time, he sees a once-wealthy man whose wealth is usurped by his girlfriends. This pushes Naanu in a dilemma and sits in a room in the first floor. The three women, with rods in their hands, decide to kill him. Bethala stops the story here and asks Vikramāditya whether Naanu would survive or die in their hands. Vikramāditya understands the tale's intention and says that Naanu, Rathi, Swathi and Keerthi are not humans and instead represent human ego, beauty, responsibilities and money respectively. He concludes that Naanu should kill himself and take a rebirth again.

Naanu sees himself in a mirror and feels ashamed of his traits. He curses himself for pursuing all the three who never gave him any happiness. He realises the importance of "Us" instead of "I" and decides that ego is the root cause of all issues. By tearing the shirt featuring an imprint of his face, he kills his inner ego and the feeling of "I". The three woman disappear and Naanu, now silent and aimless, walks out of the building drenching in the rain.

Themes and Influence

On the outset, the movie seems to be an absurd story about a troublesome narcisstic rogue who leads a weird life according to his own whims and fancies without caring for anyone and how he is possessive about the three women he likes but unable to decide with whom he wants to live. 

However, the movie is a metaphorical reference to a man‘s quest for lust and fame without willing to assume any responsibilities. This theme is depicted in the form of assigning human forms to four feelings - ego (protagonist), commitment, lust and fame. The three heroines represent three stages in a man’s life - responsibilities, lust and fame while the hero himself is a representative of human ego. 

It makes use of a concept  Maslow’s hierarchy of needs - a person’s ego, once satisfied with basic needs, longs for companionship and when they gets that, they desire for recognition in the society only to leave everything for self-realization. The three feelings are further compared to three seasons - responsibilities to rainy season (people love rain but do not wish to get drenched), lust to sunny season (heat becomes unbearable if it is too high) and fame to windy (is never constant). This is only a broad outlook and each scene in the movie speaks about worldly life purely from the point of view of human ego satisfaction. 

Further, the inter-relation between these feelings is depicted through interaction between the characters. Various issues relating to these feelings are used as sub plots -  how the human ego yearns for fame to boost itself or how it is hurt when someone taunts that achieving fame is impossible or how commitments comes in between while running behind fame or how fame is not something unachievable or how people run behind fame only for the monetary benefits it offers. These ideas are represented by following sequences which happen with one of the heroines (who is wealthy) representing fame who is named Keerthi ( literally meaning fame) :
 When the hero says he needs to spend one night with her, it sounds chauvinistic the first time but what it actually meant was each individual desires to be famous at least for one day for his ego satisfaction that he has achieved something in life.
Next the hero is beaten badly when he says the above because he is poor and she is wealthy. It actually symbolises the ego getting hurt when people mock at the desire to achieve something which is considered beyond one's reach.
 Next when he says - “Nobody wants her but they only want the wealth she brings” - it is assumed that the hero is saying that everyone is behind the heroine for her wealth but what he actually meant was - “Nobody wants fame but only the wealth which the fame fetches ”. 
 Similarly, when he says Keerthi does not belong to anyone - the first time it is perceived as him telling to others that the heroine belongs to him too whereas what he actually means is that the fame does not belong to any one individual and it can be earned by anyone.
 The director brings in sequences where the hero says one cannot gain fame without taking care of responsibility (both represented through heroines). So everytime the hero is behind  fame, responsibility appears first and asks to take care of her or sequences showing how commitment might look irksome and is not allowing to enjoy lust only to realize it was protecting from impending dangers(again represented by heroines).

Overall, it is a simple depiction of human emotions by assigning it human forms making it look complicated due to philosophical metaphors involved.

Cast 
Upendra as Naanu (translates to I/Me/Myself)
Raveena Tandon as Keerthi (Money)
Prema as Swathi (Responsibility)
Damini as Rathi (Beauty)
Arun Govil as Vikramaditya 
Gurukiran
V. Manohar
Shankar Bhat
Rajaram
N. Lokanath 
Ravi Teja
Pushpa Swamy

Release and reception
The film was dubbed in Telugu under the same name. The rights for the film for a release in Telugu were acquired by producer Ambika Krishna.

Critical reception
The film received mixed reviews from critics upon release. Reviewing the film for Deccan Herald, Srikanth wrote, "The film ... hinges on one argument that the world is full of hypocrites. While most of them do not express themselves inside out, there are others like himself who express themselves outwardly, bravely and rustically." Calling the film's screenplay "excellent", he further wrote, "Upendra has overdone his role as an actor, director, writer etc. Perhaps, we should see him as a director who puts himself in the middle of the action. Damini shines as the debutant girl. Raveena Tandon dashes off a touch of glamour. Prema is herself let down by the character."

Upendra said in an interview, "the theme is philosophical, but when I said it in a different way, some people were unable to digest it."

Box office
Upendra was a commercial success and was well received by the audience in Karnataka as well as in Andhra Pradesh. The film had a 200 days run in Karnataka and its Telugu version had a 100 days run in Andhra Pradesh.

Awards

 Filmfare Award for Best Director (Kannada) (1999)
 Filmfare Award for Best Film (Kannada) (1999)

Soundtrack
Upendra wanted A.R. Rahman to compose for film for that he met him and Mani Ratnam in the year 1997 - 98. Since he was busy after the success of Roja, Bombay and many and he was busy composing for Rangeela, Dil se then opted to the regular composer. The music was composed by Gurukiran and lyrics penned by Upendra. After a decade he made A.R. Rahman to compose for his movie Godfather in 2012. 

There was also a Telugu Dubbed soundtrack.

Sequel

A sequel to the film titled Upendra 2 was announced by Upendra in January 2012. It was later titled as Uppi 2 and was launched on 18 September 2013 at Kanteerava Studios in Bangalore. The film starred Upendra, Kristina Akheeva and Parul Yadav. The film released on 14 August 2015 in Karnataka, Andhra Pradesh, Telangana and United States simultaneously in over 600 theaters and became a commercial success.

References

External links
 

Films set in Bangalore
1999 films
1990s Kannada-language films
Films scored by Gurukiran
Films directed by Upendra